is a Japanese manga series written and illustrated by Aya Kanno. It was serialized in Hakusensha's  manga magazine , ending in the March 2006 issue on January 26, 2006. The individual chapters were collected into two bound volumes, which were published by Hakusensha on September 16, 2005, and June 19, 2006. Blank Slate was licensed in English by Viz Media, who released the manga's two volumes on October 7, 2008, and December 2, 2008, with the e-book versions released on January 29, 2013, and February 12, 2013, respectively. The manga has also been localized in France by Delcourt and in Taiwan by Ever Glory Publishing.

Reception
MangaLifes Ysabet Reinhardt MacFarlane notes that nothing about the manga portrays the Shojo Beat label on its front cover. She commends Kanno for being upfront about how "chapter 4 of the bonus episodes has been included as chapter 1", and the original first chapter is not in the book at all; she wasn't initially expecting the story to be serialized, and in retrospect felt that it didn't mesh well with the later material." Graphic Novel Reporters Casey Brienza commends Kanno's artwork, stating: "Kanno has tremendous range when it comes to her artwork. The soft, sanitized style found in Soul Rescue barely resembles the self-conscious satire of Otomen. Blank Slate sports yet a third look—bleak, brooding, and beautiful. She really takes the opportunity to strut her stuff here. The subtlety and dynamism of her layouts are top notch." However, she criticizes the manga for its "cold, detached storytelling", wooden and unimaginative fight scenes, and a robotic main character. Comic Book Bins Leroy Douresseaux commends the manga for its "shooting, blood splatters, and a mysterious, remorseless, too-cool character", and further notes that the manga should be a Shonen Jump Advanced title rather than a Shojo Beat one. Mania.com's Thomas Zoth comments on Kanno's use of "a much grittier, darker style for this neo-noir story" when compared to Otomen. He condemns the massive plot in the second volume, "where the twist effectively negates the entire point of the first three-fourths of the narrative." PopCultureShocks Michelle Smith pans the "very dull" first chapter in terms of characters and setting but notes an immediate improvement in the second chapter. She admires "the economy of the storytelling—no extraneous information is offered nor is any essential detail lacking—as well as the way the series ends." Jason Thompson, in the online appendix to Manga: The Complete Guide, commends "Aya Kanno's impressive artwork, which features sexy guys and more than adequate action scenes." Conversely, Carlo Santos of Anime News Network criticizes the manga's first volume for its "lazy art, generic action-adventure plotting, and trying-to-sound-cool-and-angsty-but-failing-miserably dialogue". He notes, however, that "each story cleverly twists into the next, creating new experiences for our antihero, as well as fleshing out the details of the bitter world he lives in."

References

External links

Manga News review 
Manga Sanctuary review 
Planete BD reviews: vol. 1, vol. 2 

Adventure anime and manga
Aya Kanno
Hakusensha manga
Science fiction anime and manga
Shōjo manga
Suspense anime and manga
Viz Media manga